The Lède is a  long river in the Lot-et-Garonne département, south-western France, right tributary of the Lot. Its source is near Lacapelle-Biron. It flows generally southwest through the town Monflanquin and flows into the Lot in Casseneuil.

References

Rivers of France
Rivers of Lot-et-Garonne
Rivers of Nouvelle-Aquitaine